is a 2021 Japanese drama film directed by Ryusuke Hamaguchi and written by Hamaguchi and Takamasa Oe. It follows a theatre director (played by Hidetoshi Nishijima), who directs a multilingual production of Uncle Vanya while dealing with the death of his wife. It is based on Haruki Murakami's short story "Drive My Car" and other stories from his 2014 collection Men Without Women.

Drive My Car had its world premiere at the 2021 Cannes Film Festival, where it competed for the Palme d'Or and won three awards, including Best Screenplay. The film received widespread critical acclaim with praise towards Hamaguchi's direction and screenplay. Many declared it the best film of 2021. It was nominated for four awards at the 94th Academy Awards, winning Best International Feature Film, and received numerous other accolades. Drive My Car was the first Japanese film to receive a Best Picture nomination (as opposed to Best International Film).

Plot
Stage actor and director Yūsuke Kafuku lives in Tokyo with his wife Oto, a screenwriter who conceives her stories during sex and narrates them to him. He learns his lines by listening to tapes recorded by Oto, while driving his red Saab 900 Turbo. After Yūsuke performs in Waiting for Godot, Oto introduces him to young television star Kōji Takatsuki. Yūsuke returns home early one day and finds his wife having sex with Kōji, but does not disturb them. After a car crash, Yūsuke discovers he has glaucoma in one eye and must take eyedrops to prevent blindness. One day, Oto asks to have a serious conversation with Yūsuke. After he spends the day driving alone, Yūsuke returns home to find Oto dead from a brain hemorrhage. After the funeral, Yūsuke breaks down while performing the title role in Uncle Vanya.

Two years later, Yūsuke accepts a residency in Hiroshima to direct a multilingual production of Uncle Vanya. The theatre festival requires that he be chauffeured in his own car for insurance reasons, and he eventually bonds with his reserved young driver, Misaki Watari. With the help of dramaturge Gong Yoon-su, Yūsuke casts a diverse group of actors to perform in their native languages. Impressed by Lee Yoo-na, a mute actress who communicates in Korean Sign Language, Yūsuke also unexpectedly casts Kōji as Uncle Vanya.

After a rehearsal, Kōji invites Yūsuke for a drink, where the young actor pushes against harsh assessments of his character but admits to his unrequited love for Oto. He scolds someone for taking a photo of him. Yoon-su invites Yūsuke and Misaki to dinner with his wife, who is revealed to be Yoo-na. Driving home, Misaki tells Yūsuke about driving her abusive mother for long hours at a young age. They later visit a garbage facility, where Misaki explains that she drove garbage trucks after leaving her hometown when a landslide destroyed her home and killed her mother. 

Drinking with Kōji again, Yūsuke reveals that he thinks he can no longer play Vanya himself, and suggests that Kōji's lack of self-control is a personal weakness but a strength as an actor. After Kōji slips away to confront a man taking photos of him, Misaki drives them home. Yūsuke reveals that he and Oto lost their young daughter, who would now be Misaki's age; Oto's gift for telling stories after sex was a bond that helped them both cope. Though he knew of his wife's affairs, Yūsuke believes she still loved him, and Kōji shares one of Oto's stories that Yūsuke never heard in its entirety.

The police interrupt a rehearsal and arrest Kōji, as the man he attacked has died from his injuries. Given two days to consider whether to take over as Vanya or else cancel the production, Yūsuke asks Misaki to take him to her childhood home in Hokkaido. Yūsuke shares his guilt for not coming home to face the discussion Oto wanted to have, which might have allowed him to save her life. Misaki reveals that she escaped the landslide but chose not to pull her mother from the wreckage, receiving a scar on her cheek she has chosen not to have treated. They visit the snowy remains of Misaki's childhood home, and hug as they both confront their shared grief.

Yūsuke assumes the role of Vanya and gives an impassioned performance before a live audience, including Misaki. Yoo-na meaningfully delivers Sonya's final lines: "We shall hear the angels, we shall see the whole sky all in diamonds, we shall see how all earthly evil, all our sufferings, are drowned in the mercy that will fill the whole world. And our life will grow peaceful, tender, sweet as a caress… You've had no joy in your life; but wait, Uncle Vanya, wait… We shall rest." Actors and audience alike are moved by the performance. Some time later, Misaki is living in Korea. Buying groceries, she returns to Yūsuke's red Saab, in which a dog rests. She takes off her surgical mask, revealing that her scar is now barely visible, and drives away.

Cast
 Hidetoshi Nishijima as Yūsuke Kafuku
 Tōko Miura as Misaki Watari
 Masaki Okada as Kōji Takatsuki
 Reika Kirishima as Oto Kafuku, Yusuke's wife
 Park Yu-rim as Lee Yoo-na
 Jin Dae-yeon as Gong Yoon-soo
 Sonia Yuan as Janice Chang
 Ahn Hwitae as Ryu Jeong-eui
 Perry Dizon as Roy Lucelo
 Satoko Abe as Yuhara

Production
The film is directed by Ryusuke Hamaguchi. The film was originally set in Busan, South Korea, but was changed to Hiroshima due to the COVID-19 pandemic.

Writing
Hamaguchi was the co-writer of the filmscript with Takamasa Oe. It is primarily based on the short story of the same name by Haruki Murakami from his 2014 short story collection, Men Without Women. The script also features elements from Murakami's stories "Scheherazade" and "Kino" (both also part of Men Without Women). For the film version, the co-authors were reported by The New York Times to have "greatly expanded on the (short) story's central dynamic, which turns on a sexist widowed actor and the much-younger female driver who motors him around in his cherished Saab."

Cinematography
Cinematographer Hidetoshi Shinomiya was assigned to do the filming for the project.

Set design
The original story features a yellow Saab 900 convertible, but it was changed in the film to a red Saab 900 Turbo to visually complement the Hiroshima landscape.

Soundtrack
Hamaguchi wished to incorporate the Beatles' song "Drive My Car", which the film and story are named after, however it was too difficult to get permission for its usage. He instead included a string quartet piece by Beethoven, which is directly referenced in Murakami's original story.

Writing for Pitchfork, Quinn Moreland wrote that the soundtrack "possesses a cool remove, mirroring the film's glacial profundity with organic nuance and contemplative improvisation." Vannesa Ague of The Quietus wrote; "Ishibashi creates a narrative within the theme and variations, tracing a musical path that stands on its own." Writing for PopMatters, Jay Honeycomb wrote; "Ishibashi's music washes over you when it comes, allowing the seeds planted by Hamaguchi to germinate and grow without drowning you in sentimentality."

The original score for Drive My Car was composed by musician Eiko Ishibashi. In an interview with Variety, director Hamaguchi said; "Typically, I don't use a lot of music in my films, but hearing the music Ishibashi made was the first time I thought this could work for the film." The soundtrack consists of 12 tracks.

Music personnel  
 Eiko Ishibashi : Piano, Rhodes, Synth, Flutes, Electronics, Melodion, Vibraphone
 Jim O'Rourke : A.Guitar, E.Guitar, Pedal Steel, Guitar, Bass, Vibraphone
 Tatsuhisa Yamamoto : Drums, Percussion
 Marty Holoubek : A.Bass, E.Bass (Track 1,2,4,8)
 Toshiaki Sudoh : E. Bass (Track 5,10)
 Atsuko Hatano : Violin, Viola

Release
Drive My Car had its world premiere at the 2021 Cannes Film Festival in competition for the Palme d'Or. It was released in United Kingdom on 19 November 2021 and on 24 November 2021 in the United States.

Home media
The DVD and Blu-ray versions of the film were released on July 19, 2022 in the USA as part of the library of The Criterion Collection films.

Reception

Box office 
, Drive My Car has grossed $2.3 million in the United States and Canada, and $12.3 million in other territories, for a worldwide total of $14.7 million.

In the United States, the film had grossed $944,000 at the time of its Oscar nominations on February 8, 2022. Between then and March 20, it grossed $1.15 million (a 122% increase), for a running total of $2.1 million.

Critical response 
On Rotten Tomatoes, the film holds an approval rating of 97% based on 215 reviews, with an average rating of 8.6/10. The website's critical consensus reads, "Drive My Cars imposing runtime holds a rich, patiently engrossing drama that reckons with self-acceptance and regret." According to Metacritic, which assigned a weighted average score of 91 out of 100 based on 42 critics, the film received "universal acclaim".

The film received a positive review from Manohla Dargis in The New York Times, where she wrote, "Drive My Car sneaks up on you, lulling you in with visuals that are as straightforward as the narrative is complex." Writing for The Guardian, Peter Bradshaw gave the film five stars out of five and called it an "engrossing and exalting experience".

Metacritic reported that Drive My Car appeared on over 89 film critics' top-ten lists for 2021, the most of any foreign-language film that year, and ranked first or second on 23 lists.

Carlos Aguilar found the cinematography of the film to be exceptional, stating that: "Bountiful in subtle imagery from cinematographer Hidetoshi Shinomiya, the film mines majestic visual symbolism from seemingly ordinary occurrences. Take for example a shot of Yūsuke and Misaki's hand through the car's sunroof holding cigarettes as to not let the smoke permeate their sacred mode of transportation—an unspoken communion of respect."

Justin Chang described it as "a masterpiece" that is "Perfectly paced, intricately structured and entirely absorbing". He credits "the elusive magic" that transpires between the films two primary actors, Hidetoshi Nishijima and Tōko Miura, and "how acting can achieve the force of real life, and how real life requires a measure of acting."

Accolades 

The film was selected to compete for the Palme d'Or at the 2021 Cannes Film Festival where it won three awards including Best Screenplay. Hamaguchi and Oe became the first Japanese individuals to win the Best Screenplay Award at Cannes. At the 79th Golden Globe Awards, the film won Best Foreign Language Film.

It was picked as the Japanese entry for the Best International Feature Film at the 94th Academy Awards, making the December 2021 shortlist. It was nominated for four Academy Awards, including Best Picture, Best Director for Hamaguchi, Best Adapted Screenplay for Hamaguchi and co-screenwriter Takamasa Oe, and Best International Feature Film, winning the latter award.  It was the first Japanese film to receive a Best Picture nomination, and Hamaguchi became the third Japanese director nominated for Best Director since Hiroshi Teshigahara in 1965 and Akira Kurosawa in 1985.

It became one of only seven films (and the first non-English-language film) to win Best Picture from all three major U.S. critics groups (LAFCA, NYFCC, NSFC), the other six being Goodfellas, Schindler's List, L.A. Confidential, The Social Network, The Hurt Locker, and Tár.

See also
 List of submissions to the 94th Academy Awards for Best International Feature Film
 List of Japanese submissions for the Academy Award for Best International Feature Film
 Road movie

References

External links
 
Drive My Car on Rotten Tomatoes

2021 films
2021 drama films
2021 independent films
2020s Japanese-language films
Asian Film Award for Best Film winners
Best Foreign Language Film Academy Award winners
Best Foreign Language Film BAFTA Award winners
Best Foreign Language Film Golden Globe winners
Films about actors
Films about automobiles
Films about grieving
Films about theatre
Films impacted by the COVID-19 pandemic
Films set in Hiroshima
Films set in Hokkaido
Films set in Japan
Films set in South Korea
Films shot in Hiroshima
Films shot in Hokkaido
Films based on works by Haruki Murakami
Films based on short fiction
Films directed by Ryusuke Hamaguchi
Japanese drama films
Picture of the Year Japan Academy Prize winners